Papyrus 68 (in the Gregory-Aland numbering), designated by 𝔓68, is a copy of the New Testament in Greek. It is a papyrus manuscript of the First Epistle to the Corinthians. The surviving texts of 1 Corinthians are verses 4:12-17; 4:19-5:3. The manuscript palaeographically has been assigned to the 7th century.

Text 
The Greek text of this codex is mixed. Aland placed it in Category III.

Location 
It is currently housed at the Russian National Library (Gr. 258B) in Saint Petersburg.

See also 
 1 Corinthians 4; 5
 List of New Testament papyri

References

Further reading 

 Kurt Aland, Neue neutestamentliche Papyri, NTS 3 (1957), pp. 265–267. 
 Kurt Treu, Die Griechischen Handschriften des Neuen Testaments in der UdSSR; eine systematische Auswertung des Texthandschriften in Leningrad, Moskau, Kiev, Odessa, Tbilisi und Erevan, T & U 91 (Berlin, 1966), p. 109.

External links 
 GA Papyrus 68. Center for the Study of New Testament Manuscripts

New Testament papyri
7th-century biblical manuscripts
National Library of Russia collection
First Epistle to the Corinthians papyri